Agonidium kinangopinum is a species of ground beetle in the subfamily Platyninae. It was described by Alluaud in 1917.

References

kinangopinum
Beetles described in 1917